Azala may refer to:

 Azala, an Ancient Babylonian cartographer. See: History of cartography#Ancient Near East
 Azala, a character from the video game Chrono Trigger. See: Characters of Chrono Trigger#Ayla
 Azala, the goddess of air in the Cirque du Soleil production Dralion
 Azala, main page in the Basque Wikipedia
 Princess Azala, a character from the 1944 Colombian film serial The Desert Hawk

See also
 Azalea (disambiguation)
 Azalia (disambiguation)
 Azela Robinson (born 1965), British-born Mexican actress
 Azula, antagonist in Avatar: The Last Airbender